Elections to Nuneaton and Bedworth Borough Council were held on 6 May 2010. Half of the council was up for election and the Conservative Party lost control of the council, leaving it hung and Labour the largest party.
This was the first time that the borough council had been hung since before 1974 when the new authority was formed.

After the election, the composition of the council was

 Labour 17 (+2)
 Conservative 15 (-2)
 BNP 1
 Others 1

The 2009 Camphill by-election ensured Labour 17 seats by the time of the 2010 result.

Election results

Ward results

2010
Nuneaton and Bedworth Borough Council election
Nuneaton and Bedworth Borough Council election
2010s in Warwickshire